Alfred Uvedale Miller Lambert  (1870–1928) was an English local historian and antiquarian. He and his wife Cecily (Jane Frances Cecily, née Hoare) lived at South Park, Bletchingley, Surrey.

His parents were Henry Thomas Lambert and Georgina Emily Lambert (née Miller), who bought South Park in 1875.

In 1926 Lambert and his wife offered a barn (and also the adjoining stables) which they owned  at Stonehall Farm, Hurst Green, Oxted, Surrey as one of the 25 new churches wanted in the Diocese of Southwark. The barn was moved to North Sheen (now incorporated into Kew), where it was reconstructed as a church, St Philip and All Saints, now known as The Barn Church, Kew. Lambert died before its completion, and the church is dedicated in his memory. The lady chapel at The Barn Church was furnished in memory of Uvedale and Cecily Lambert by their son Uvedale Lambert and was dedicated by The Venerable Charles Lambert on All Saints' Day, 2 November 1933.

Lambert's papers were donated to Surrey History Centre in Woking by his granddaughter, Sarah Goad.

Family
The Lamberts had one child, a son, Henry Uvedale Hoare Lambert (1909–1983), who inherited South Park and, like his father, was also a local historian.

Works
Bletchingley: a parish history, together with some account of the family of De Clere chiefly in the south of England (1921), Mitchell Hughes and Clark
 Godstone: a parish history (1929)

References

1870 births
1928 deaths
19th-century antiquarians
19th-century British historians
20th-century antiquarians
20th-century British historians
English local historians
English philanthropists
Fellows of the Society of Antiquaries of London
People from Tandridge (district)